La La's Full Court Life is an American reality television series on VH1. The series debuted on August 22, 2011, and is the follow up series to La La's Full Court Wedding. La La's Full Court Life chronicles the life of Alani Vasquez aka La La as she experiences married life with the professional basketball player Carmelo Anthony, evolving from being the fiancée of a basketball player to being a basketball wife and how she manages her life while keeping her career in check.

Cast
 La La Vasquez
 Carmelo Anthony
 Candice "Dice" Dixon: La La's cousin and best friend
 Po Johnson: La La's best friend

Episodes

Series overview

Season 1 (2011)

Season 2 (2012)

Season 3 (2013)

Season 4 (2013)

Season 5 (2014)

References

2010s American reality television series
2011 American television series debuts
African-American reality television series
English-language television shows
VH1 original programming
2014 American television series endings
American sequel television series
Television series by 51 Minds Entertainment